The Angelicals were an Augustinian order of nuns that were active in Italy from the sixteenth to the nineteenth century.

See also
Guastallines

References

Independent Augustinian communities